Kallithea Elassonos, known before 1927 as Sadovo, is a village and a community of the Elassona municipality. Before the 2011 local government reform it was a part of the municipality of Olympos. The 2011 census recorded 652 inhabitants in the village and 699 inhabitants in the community. The community of Kallithea Elassonos covers an area of 30.437 km2.

Administrative division
The community of Kallithea Elassonos consists of two settlements:
Kallithea
 Petroto

Population
According to the 2011 census, the population of the settlement of Kallithea was 652 people, a decrease of almost 5% compared with the population of the previous census of 2001.

Geography
Kallithea Elassonos is situated at an elevation above 500 m in a plain southwest of Greece's tallest mountain, Mount Olympus. It is 10 km north of Elassona, 42 km southwest of Katerini, 44 km northwest of Larissa, and 49 km southeast of Kozani. The Greek National Road 13 (Elassona – Katerini) passes west of the village.

See also
 List of settlements in the Larissa regional unit

References

Populated places in Larissa (regional unit)